The  Sree Vaikom Mahadeva Temple is a temple dedicated to the Hindu god Shiva in Vaikom, Kerala, India.
The temple, along with the Ettumanoor Shiva Temple and the Kaduthuruthy Shiva Temple is considered a powerful place of Shiva. The belief is that if a devotee worships all the three temples before the Ucha puja, all his/her wishes are fulfilled. It is one of the oldest temples in Kerala and is famous for its Vaikom Ashtami festival.

The temple is one of the few temples which is held in reverence by both Shaivas, the adherents of Shiva and Vaishnavas, the adherents of Vishnu. In Vaikom, Shiva is fondly called as Vaikkathappan, the lord of Vaikom. The lingam here is believed to be from the Treta Yuga, the third age of Hinduism and is considered one of the oldest temples in Kerala where puja has not been broken since its inception.

The temple is one of the major Shiva temples in Kerala held in reverence along with the temples in Ettumanoor, Kaduthuruthy, Vazhappally, Chengannur, Ernakulam, Vadakkunathan and Thirunakkara.

Origin 
The demon Khara, on receiving the Shaiva Vidya Upadesha, (the knowledge of Shaivisim) from Malyavan went to the holy city of Chidambaram in present-day Tamil Nadu and did severe penances and meditation for the attainment of Moksha or liberation. Pleased with his penance, Shiva appeared and granted all the boons he asked, and presented him with three great lingams, drawn out of Him. Assuring that He will ever be present in them, Shiva asked Khara to worship the Lingas to attain salvation and disappeared. When Khara was returning south from the Himalayas with the three lingams, one in his right hand, one in his left hand and other by the neck, he felt tired and rested awhile. After rest when he tried to pick up the lingas, they wouldn't budge. He realized that it was Shiva's magic (maya) and when called unto, the heavens spoke thus, "I shall remain here giving Moksha (salvation) to whoever takes refuge in Me!". Khara, having attained liberation, entrusted the lingams to the custody of the sage Vyaghrapada who had followed him invisibly and asked the sage to protect and worship them.

Myths & Beliefs 

On the day of Vrichika Ashtami (According to Malayalam calendar), Shiva and his consort Parvati appeared before Vyaghrapada. The Lord proclaimed, "This place shall be known as Vyaghrapadapurma", and disappeared. The world-famous Vaikkathashtami festival and all connected holy festivals are observed here even to this day on the same Vrichika Ashtami.

Vyaghrapada continued the puja with full devotion for some time and went on a pilgrimage. Months and years passed. Parashurama had passed by the place one day. Seeing good omens, he alighted and saw a lingam submerged in water emitting heavenly rays. He could understand that it was the lingam placed by Khara.
Parashurama thought to himself that, Vyaghrapadapurma, the holiest place on Earth, could be a great refuge for the devoted who wish to attain liberation. He consecrated the lingam here with his earnest prayers and recited holy mantras.

Pleased with his devotion, Shiva appeared with his consort Parvati before Parashurama. He was so pleased to see that the lingam was consecrated with the customs and rites by Parashurama, his greatest devotee.

Full of joy and gratitude, Parashurama performed puja there for some days. Then he built a temple here and entrusted a noble Brahmin man from the Taruna village. He taught the brahmin, the holy chants, mantras, procedures and shlokas necessary to perform puja to Shiva and initiated him as the chief priest of the temple. Parashurama donated the whole temple to the brahmin and disappeared. It is the belief that the temple and its connected customs and rites are planned and fixed by Parashurama himself.

It is believed that Shiva, also known here as Vyaghralayesha (the lord of Vyaghrapadapurma), gives His blessings to the devotees in three incarnations or avatars, in the morning as Dakshinamurthi, in the afternoon as Kiratamurthi, and as Shakti Panchakshari in the evening.

The closed western door 

The temple was in the ownership of 108 families in olden days. The owners were divided into two groups and one group joined the king's side. Their disputes and quarrels increased day by day. One day a section of the divided group came to the temple at noon. The chief of one of the groups, Njallal Namboothiri barged into the temple to stop the puja. At that time the naivedyam, the food offered to the deity, was used to be placed in the western side of the Namaskara Mandapa hall. Njallal Namboothiri barged through the western door, kept his shawl above the western door and spat the remains of his paan on the food. Thus, the puja was disrupted. On return, while he was taking his shawl from the door top, he was bit by a highly poisonous snake. He crawled himself outside the western door and died. The door automatically closed itself and a heavenly voice was heard from inside the sanctum sanctorum saying, "This door should not be opened anymore!". The door remains closed to this day to show the wrath of Shiva against the disruption of his worship.

Architecture 

One of the biggest temples in Kerala, the temple has a courtyard of about eight acres of land. The premises levelled with river sand is protected by compound walls with four gopurams or entrance towers on all the four sides. Even though temples are generally constructed near perfect East-West direction (e.g., the temples in Ettumanoor and Kaduthuruthy), the Vaikom temple is built a tilt of five degrees in the North-South direction. The sanctum sanctorum is apparently round in shape roofed with copper sheets and with two chambers. In fact, this is the only temple in Kerala with an oval shaped sanctum, though externally it appears like a circular temple. This oval shape is evident when the width of antharaala is measured. Only builders with exceptional skill can execute such marvellous architectural structures. The remnants of the basement of the original sanctum at the temple in Chengannur also reveal that it was elliptical in shape. It is believed that both these structures were built by Perumthachan, who was an exceptional architect of his time. The Mukha Mandapa, the first pillared hall and chamber is built in shaped stone and single piece woods. The walls and pillars are very strong. The garbhagriha or the sanctum sanctorum – the second chamber is built completely in stone including the roof in a square shape. It is a very curious and peculiar fact that we are unable to obtain the darshana of the lingam from the sanctum without passing through a staircase with six steps, either from the entrance or the sanctum. It signifies the six vikaras (impurities) which are Kama (lust), Krodha (anger), Lobha (power), Moha (attachment), Mada (ego) and Matsarya (envy). Crossing the staircase signifies the devotee letting go of these six impurities and attaining liberation or moksha. This is well depicted in the famous Malayalam song, Naranayingane Janichu Bhoomiyil, written about the deity of this temple.

Vaikom Ashtami

The Vaikom temple is famous for the Vaikom Ashtami (Vaikathashtami), one of its main festivals, which is held in from November–December. The exact date of the festival is determined by the Malayalam calendar. Vaikathashtami is celebrated on the day of Krishna Ashtami in the Malayalam month of Vrischikam. It commemorates the appearance of Shiva before Vyaghrapada.

Picture gallery

References

http://www.vaikomtemple.org/Default.aspx
https://www.templespedia.com/vaikathastami-myth/

External links

Official website
Temple History

Hindu temples in Kottayam district
Shiva temples in Kerala
temple
108 Shiva Temples